WOMC (104.3 FM, "104.3 WOMC") is a commercial radio station in Detroit, Michigan. It airs a classic hits radio format and is owned by Audacy, Inc.  The transmitter and studios are both located on American Drive off 11 Mile Road in Southfield, Michigan.

WOMC has an effective radiated power (ERP) of 190,000 watts from a height above average terrain (HAAT) of 361 feet.  It is grandfathered at a much higher power than would be permitted today, 50,000 watts.  WOMC broadcasts in the HD Radio hybrid format; its HD2 subchannel formerly played oldies from the 1950s, 1960s and 1970s as the main signal once did, while the HD3 subchannel was called "Musictown 104-3", and featured all Detroit artists.

History

Early years
On March 5, 1948, the station signed on as WEXL-FM.  It was owned by Royal Oak Broadcasting, along with AM sister station WEXL.  Both stations were licensed to Royal Oak, Michigan.  The two stations simulcasted much of their programming from 1948 until the 1960s.

WEXL-AM-FM were acquired by family-owned Sparks Broadcasting in the 1950s. J.B. Sparks served as president, with Garnet Sparks and Gordon Sparks serving in other management roles.

In the early 1950s, the FM station changed to WOMC while the AM station remained WEXL.  The call sign stands for "Wayne, Oakland and Macomb Counties.  The Sparks were able to boost WOMC's output to 214,000 watts, among the highest powered FM stations in the U.S.  Today, the Federal Communications Commission does not license any station in the Detroit area for more than 50,000 watts, unless it dates back to the early days of FM radio.

In the 1960s, the FCC began encouraging AM stations to develop new programming for their FM counterparts, rather than simply simulcasting.  WOMC would switch to a Beautiful Music format, consisting of quarter-hour sweeps of instrumental cover versions of popular songs, as well as Hollywood and Broadway showtunes.  Other Detroit stations also ran this largely automated format, including WJR-FM and WWJ-FM.

WOMC was typically mired near the bottom of the local Arbitron ratings until 1973, when it was purchased by Metromedia.  The new owners retooled WOMC's easy listening format to include brighter and more uptempo material, an approach modeled after the successful WQLR-FM in Kalamazoo. WOMC's sales manager Bob Reinhardt was impressed with WQLR's format, especially when he learned that the station was programmed in-house and did not use a syndicated service, and requested that WQLR's programmers create a similar format for WOMC.  WOMC's revised beautiful music format was an quick success, lifting the station from 28th place in the Detroit Arbitron ratings into the top three. This marked the beginning of the beautiful music syndication service known as KalaMusic.

During the late 1970s, WOMC enlisted the help of program director and legendary Detroit disc jockey Dave Shafer, who recruited other well-known Detroit radio personalities Marc Avery (who died in 2004), Tom Dean and Nick Arama.  By 1980, WOMC evolved from easy listening to a soft, gold-based Adult Contemporary format, which proved to be quite popular. During the 1980s, the adult contemporary format field in Detroit was rather crowded, with WOMC competing against WNIC, WMJC and WLTI.  WOMC differentiated itself from its competitors by emphasizing oldies.

In April 1988, Infinity Broadcasting bought WOMC.  Infinity was merged into CBS Radio in December 2005.

Evolution to oldies
In 1990, WOMC had become almost exclusively an oldies station, despite the fact that Detroit had several other oldies stations at the time, including WKSG, CKLW-FM, and WHND.  Eventually, WOMC came to dominate as the most popular choice for oldies in the market.

WOMC had many memorable slogans, like "WOM-SEE", "Detroit's Big O" and "Music Now!"  DJs said the call letters with an emphasis on the O ("W Ohhh M C").

In 2006, under the leadership of Steve Alan, the station removed the word "Oldies" from all station imaging and jingles, and rebranded as "The Motor City's 104.3."  The ratings remained strong during the transition to classic hits.

In early 2007, under the guidance of Detroit-based programming consultant Gary Berkowitz, the station started using the word "Oldies" again in jingles and imaging, but the heritage WOMC call letters were only used for the top of the hour legal ID.  Randy Reeves became the voice of WOMC in promos and liners.  The station began using a combination of the "Do It Again" and "Home of the Hits" jingle packages, as well as selected PAMS jingle packages from JAM Creative Productions.  Berkowitz then brought in Scott Walker to become program director.

In August 2007, WOMC-FM had begun airing brief jingles and "retromercials" that formerly aired on AM 800 CKLW during its famous tenure as the "Big 8."  Much of the same music heard on WOMC had been staples on CKLW in the 1960s, 70s and 80s.

Classic hits era
In April 2009, under the leadership of Tom Bigby, Tim Roberts, and Tom Sleeker, WOMC once again dropped the "Oldies" branding from the station. Once Roberts was named Operations Manager and Program Director, the transition to "Classic Hits" from "Oldies" continued. During that time, WOMC replaced voiceover guy Charlie Van Dyke with Jeff Davis. The station changed to "104.3 WOMC, Detroit's Greatest Hits."

In 2010, the station added 80s music, while continuing to play a variety of music from 1960s through the 80s.  In 2013, WOMC made its usual switch to all Christmas music from mid-November 2013 until December 25.  Once Christmas was over, WOMC dropped all music before 1965 and focused more on the '70s and '80s while still retaining about a dozen songs from the late '60s in its playlist.

WOMC, along with co-owned WWJ, were the flagship stations of the Michigan IMG Sports Network.  The two CBS-owned stations carried University of Michigan Wolverines football and some men's basketball games.  Most of the games are now heard on only WWJ.

In 2017, WOMC added some music from the 1990s and early 2000s, while the remainder of the '60s music and most of the early '70s were dropped.  By the end of the year, the playlist consisted of music from 1975-2002, but very heavily focused on the '80s.

On February 2, 2017, CBS Radio announced it would merge with Entercom. The merger was approved on November 9, 2017, and was consummated on the 17th.

On December 26, 2017, after its usual November–December break for Christmas music, the station re-branded as "The New 104.3 WOMC", and returned to a playlist focusing primarily on songs from the late 1960s, 1970s and 1980s, while also dropping post-1980s music. In addition, Bobby Mitchell and Stacey DuFord would step down as morning hosts, being replaced in the interim by Jeff Miles, formerly of WKLB-FM in Boston.

In March 2018, WOMC announced that former WXYZ-TV anchor Stephen Clark would join the station as a new morning host, beginning on April 2.  In addition, his former WXYZ-TV co-anchor JoAnne Purtan, daughter of former longtime WOMC morning host Dick Purtan, joined Clark as co-host the following week.

In 2020, WOMC once again dropped all songs older than 1970 from the playlist, and added back music from the 1990s and early 2000s. Stephen Clark also departed from the morning show, with J.J. Johnson adjusting his mid-day hours to also co-host the morning show with JoAnne Purtan. Jason Raithel also joined as a producer.

Christmas music
For much of the 2000s, WOMC would play all-Christmas music from mid-November until Christmas, suspending its classic hits format in those weeks.  In November 2019, WOMC did not switch to all-Christmas music as in past years, delegating the programming to Soft AC-formatted sister station WDZH until 2020. However, WOMC played Christmas music from December 23 to 25, meaning that WOMC now only plays Christmas music on Christmas Eve and Day.

HD Radio
WOMC is licensed for HD Radio operations, and has two subchannels. Originally, WOMC-HD2 featured hits of the 1950s and 1960s. Gradually, the format began to evolve into pop hits of the 1960s, 1970s and 1980s. WOMC had changed its station voice twice, and at one time, all three station voices could be heard doing liners for WOMC-HD2. In January 2008, WOMC-HD2's format changed back to the hits of the 1950s and 1960s. Every day, beginning at 1:00 p.m., the station played an hour of Elvis music. The station would also occasionally play a retro PAMS jingle from the early-mid 1990s.

In November 2008, WOMC had plans to re-create the sound of legendary Detroit Top 40 station WKNR Keener 13 for its HD2 stream. On November 8, 2008, a Keener Radio logo appeared on WOMC's website.  However, the program director of the HD2 channel, Ted Richards, was let go in April 2009, and the Keener Radio idea never took off.  In April 2009, WOMC-HD2 picked up the "Oldies 104.3" branding which was dropped from the main FM channel, and would also shift its format to playing music from the 1950s, 1960s and 1970s.

In February 2010, WOMC added an HD3 channel known as "New Sky Radio: New Horizons, No Boundaries."  It mainly featured psychic talk shows and readings, along with various lifestyle talk shows.  On January 1, 2014, WOMC-HD3 dropped "New Sky Radio," switching to an all-Detroit artists format, branded as "Detroit's Boulevard 104-3." This would later rebrand as "Musictown 104.3."

The HD subchannels have since been turned off.

See also
Media in Detroit

References

List of "grandfathered" FM "Superpower" radio stations in the U.S.
Michiguide.com - WOMC History

External links
 
 

OMC
Classic hits radio stations in the United States
Radio stations established in 1948
1948 establishments in Michigan
Audacy, Inc. radio stations